This article presents the discography of the jazz singer, songwriter, and composer Peggy Lee, covering her recording career from 1941 up to 1993.

Albums

Capitol Records
 1948 Rendezvous with Peggy Lee (3-disc 78rpm set: 6 songs)
 1950 Rendezvous with Peggy Lee (10-inch version: 8 songs)
 1950 My Best to You: Peggy Lee Sings (10-inch LP: 8 songs)
 1955 Rendezvous with Peggy Lee (12-inch version: 12 songs)

Decca Records

 1953 Black Coffee (10-inch version; 8 songs)
 1954 Songs in an Intimate Style
 1954 Selections from Irving Berlin's White Christmas (w/ Bing Crosby and Danny Kaye)
 1955 Songs from Pete Kelly's Blues 
 1956 Black Coffee (12-inch version; 12 songs)
 1957 Dream Street
 1957 Songs from Walt Disney's "Lady and the Tramp"
 1958 Sea Shells (recorded 1955)
 1959 Miss Wonderful (recorded 1956)
 1964 Lover (recorded 1952)
 1964 The Fabulous Peggy Lee (recorded 1953–56)

Harmony
 1957 Peggy Lee Sings with Benny Goodman (Harmony)

Capitol

 1957 The Man I Love
 1958 Jump for Joy
 1958 Things Are Swingin'
 1959 I Like Men!
 1959 Beauty and the Beat!
 1960 Latin ala Lee!
 1960 All Aglow Again!
 1960 Pretty Eyes
 1960 Christmas Carousel
 1960 Olé ala Lee
 1961 If You Go
 1961 Basin Street East Proudly Presents Miss Peggy Lee
 1962 Blues Cross Country
 1962 Bewitching-Lee
 1962 Sugar 'N' Spice
 1963 Mink Jazz
 1963 I'm a Woman
 1964 In Love Again!
 1964 In the Name of Love
 1965 Pass Me By
 1965 Then Was Then – Now Is Now!
 1965 Happy Holiday
 1966 Guitars a là Lee
 1966 Big $pender
 1967 Extra Special!
 1967 Somethin' Groovy!
 1968 2 Shows Nightly
 1969 A Natural Woman
 1969 Is That All There Is?
 1970 Bridge Over Troubled Water
 1970 Make It With You
 1971 Where Did They Go
 1972 Norma Deloris Egstrom from Jamestown, North Dakota

Post-Capitol albums

 1974 Let's Love
 1975 Mirrors
 1977 Live in London
 1977 Peggy
 1979 Close Enough for Love
 1988 Miss Peggy Lee Sings the Blues
 1989 The Peggy Lee Songbook: There'll Be Another Spring
 1993 Love Held Lightly: Rare Songs by Harold Arlen (rec. 1988)
 1993 Moments Like This

As guest vocalist
With Benny Carter
Benny Carter Songbook (MusicMasters, 1996)

Singles

With Benny Goodman and His Orchestra
1 Denotes non-Peggy Lee, non-album B-sides

With Bob Crosby & His Orchestra
Both are non-charting, non-album tracks

Peggy Lee solo, accompanied by various orchestras

References

Discographies of American artists
Vocal jazz discographies